Salvado is a surname. Notable people with the surname include:

 Albert Salvadó (1951–2020), Andorran writer and industrial engineer
 Alex Salvado (1890–1954), Australian rules footballer
 Davide Salvado (born 1981), Galician musician
 John Salvado (born 1939), Australian cricketer
 Luciana Salvadó (born 1990), Argentinian handballer
 Rosendo Salvado (1814–1900), Benedictine monk

See also
 Patrick Salvador Idringi (born 1985), comedian